The Bareunmirae Party, also known as the Bareun Mirae Party and Bareun Future Party, was a South Korean liberal-conservative political party. It was founded in 2018 by merger of the centrist liberal People's Party and the conservative Bareun Party.

History

Founding 
In January 2018, leaders of the party's predecessors announced their plan to merge, in an effort to form a centrist bloc and consolidate their parliamentary standings before local elections.

The merger was noted to be a bold political experiment, as People's Party is rooted in the Jeolla Provinces, while Bareun Party is rooted in the Gyeongsang Provinces.

The party was formally established on 13 February 2018.

The merger was commented as being "hasty", as it was announced before the two respective parties underwent due process to confirm the union, and was seen as an attempt to consolidate the plan amidst opposition. The merger plan faced opposition from members of both parties, citing concerns over differences in ideology and policy, particularly over differing stances on dealing with North Korea.

Internal split-off 
The plan to form the Bareunmirae Party faced opposition from the faction of the People's Party associated with the provinces of North and South Jeolla (both of which are noted to be liberal-leaning provinces). Opposition within the People's Party led to 16 of its lawmakers, including Park Jie-won and Chung Dong-young, to announce plans for a new party. The lawmakers were noted to having belonged to a faction that was closely associated with late former President Kim Dae-jung. The new party, named Party for Democracy and Peace, was launched on 6 February 2018 alongside Bareunmirae, with the merging of the People's Party and Bareun Party.

List of leaders

Chairpersons

Assembly leaders (Floor leaders)

Election results

See also 
 Conservatism in South Korea
 Liberalism in South Korea
 Centrist reformism

References

External links 

  

 
2018 establishments in South Korea
Political parties established in 2018
Centre-right parties in Asia
Liberal conservative parties
Liberal parties in South Korea
Conservative parties in South Korea
Social conservative parties